Heathcote National Park is a protected national park that is located in the southern region of Sydney, New South Wales in eastern Australia, and is situated on Dharawal country.

Geography
The park consists of 2,679 hectares of woodland, predominantly dry schlerophyll forest on the ridges and low heath in the wetter areas. The Hawkesbury sandstone has been carved up by various watercourses like Heathcote Creek, Kingfisher Creek and Myuna Creek, creating deep valleys. The Hawkesbury sandstone has created a sandy, infertile soil that is typical of the Sydney region.

The main walking track is the Bullawarring Track, which stretches from Waterfall to Heathcote. It largely follows the valley of Heathcote Creek, the main watercourse in the park, as well as utilizing a maintenance road that leads from Woronora Dam to Heathcote Road.

It is bounded by Holsworthy and Pleasure Point to the north, Heathcote and Lucas Heights to the east, the Greater Western Sydney region to the west (which include the suburbs of Glenfield, Macquarie Fields and Campbelltown), and Helensburgh to the south in the Illawarra.

History

Before European settlement, the Dharawal people, an Aboriginal Australian people, lived in the area. They left their mark at a number of known sites, which include shield trees along the Bullawarring Track and charcoal drawings along Myuna Creek. In addition, a number of Europeans lived in rough huts in the park during the Great Depression, leaving behind meagre ruins at places like Myuna Creek.

This was the beginning of Heathcote National Park, which eventually grew to over two thousand hectares.

Features

Landscape
The park consists of a deeply dissected Hawkesbury sandstone plateau, part of the Woronora Plateau The creek gorges include Heathcote Creek, a tributary of the Georges River. The sandstone was formed 200 million years ago, and periods of uplift began about 94 million years ago. Each period of uplift caused stream erosion, which cut more deeply into the plateau surface. Heathcote Creek cascades down a number of rock pools and small waterfalls to the Woronora River at the northern end of the park.

Flora

The ridges and drier slopes are covered in forest dominated by angophoras and eucalypts such as bloodwood, greygum, Sydney peppermint, and scribbly gum. Grass-trees are common. Low heath growth consists of shrubs, including ti trees, banksias, hakeas, and waxflowers. Gymea lilies and forest oaks grow on the moister slopes. Blackbutts and grevilleas grow in the Heathcote Creek Valley.

Fauna
Sugar gliders, ring tail possums, and possibly eastern pygmy possums inhabit both Mirang Creek and Minda Gully. Swamp wallabies are also present. Honeyeaters are often seen, as well as superb lyrebirds. Fish, eels and crayfish are commonly found in the creeks.

See also

 Protected areas of New South Wales
 Royal National Park
 Geography of Sydney

References

External links

 
 
 
 
 
 
  List of animals recorded in the park

National parks of New South Wales
Protected areas established in 1943
1943 establishments in Australia
Heathcote, New South Wales
Sclerophyll forests